St. John Catholic Church or St. John's Catholic Church, and variations, may refer to:

United States 
(by state then city)
 St. John the Evangelist Catholic Church (Indianapolis, Indiana)
 St. John's Catholic Church (Bangor, Maine), listed on the NRHP in Maine
 St. John Catholic Church (Saint John Plantation, Maine)
 St. John's Catholic Church (Worcester, Massachusetts)
 St. John the Baptist Catholic Church (Canton, Ohio), listed on the NRHP in Ohio
 St. John's Catholic Church (Delphos, Ohio), listed on the NRHP in Ohio
 St. John's Catholic Church (Fryburg, Ohio), listed on the NRHP in Ohio
 St. John's Catholic Church (Paxton, South Dakota), listed on the NRHP in South Dakota

South Korea 
 St. John's Church, Seongnam, also known as St. John's Catholic Church